Forest is a hamlet in North Yorkshire, England, near the town of Richmond. It is near the villages of Scorton and Bolton-on-Swale.

The only public amenity in Forest is a red telephone box.

Forest is not served by any public transport.

References

External links

Villages in North Yorkshire